The 1951 United Kingdom general election was held twenty months after the 1950 general election, which the Labour Party had won with a slim majority of just five seats. The Labour government called a snap election for Thursday 25 October 1951 in the hope of increasing its parliamentary majority. However, despite winning the popular vote and achieving both the highest-ever total vote (until it was surpassed by the Conservative Party in 1992 and again in 2019) and highest percentage vote share, Labour won fewer seats than the Conservative Party. This was mainly due to the collapse of the Liberal vote, which enabled the Conservatives to win seats by default. The election marked the return of Winston Churchill as Prime Minister, and the beginning of Labour's thirteen-year spell in opposition. This was the third and final general election to be held during the reign of King George VI, as he died the following year on 6 February and was succeeded by his daughter, Elizabeth II. It was the last election in which the Conservatives did better in Scotland than in England.

The 1951 election was the second one to be covered on BBC Television. On election night, the results were televised from the BBC Lime Grove Studios in London. Graham Hutton, David Butler and H. G. Nicholas headed the election night coverage from 10.15pm until 4.00am on the television service. On the following day, television coverage started at 10.00am and continued throughout the day until 5.00pm.

Background
King George VI was apprehensive that, given that the government had such a slim majority and that he was to leave the country to go on his planned Commonwealth tour in early 1952, there was a possibility of a change of government in his absence; Clement Attlee decided to call the election to assuage this concern. (In the event, the King became too ill to travel, and delegated the tour to his daughter Princess Elizabeth shortly before his death in February 1952). Parliament was dissolved on 5 October 1951.

The Labour government, which by now had implemented most of its manifesto from the 1945 election, was beginning to lose cabinet ministers, such as Ernest Bevin (death) and Stafford Cripps (health issues). The Conservative Party, however, after the previous year's election, had more new MPs.

Campaign
The Labour Party entered the election weakened by the emerging schism between Gaitskellites, on the right of the party, and left-wing Bevanites. Its manifesto stated that the party "proud of its record, sure in its policies—confidently asks the electors to renew its mandate". It identified four key tasks facing the United Kingdom which it would tackle: the need to work for peace, the need to work to "maintain full employment and to increase production", the need to reduce cost of living, and the need to "build a just society". The manifesto argued that only a Labour government could achieve these tasks. It also contrasted the Britain of 1951 with that of the interwar years (when there had largely been Conservative-led governments), saying this period saw "mass-unemployment; mass fear; mass misery". It did not promise more nationalisations as it did in the previous year's election, and instead focused on offering more council housing and a pledge to "associate the workers more closely with the administration of public industries and services", although it remained opposed to full workers' control of industries.

While Labour began to have some policy divisions during the election campaign, the Conservatives ran an efficient campaign that was well-funded and orchestrated. Their manifesto Britain Strong and Free stressed that safeguarding "our traditional way of life" was integral to the Conservative purpose. Significantly, they did not propose to dismantle the British welfare state or the National Health Service which the Labour government had established. The manifesto did, however, promise to "stop all further nationalisation" and to repeal the Steel Act introduced by the Labour government, which was being implemented during the election season. It also attacked Labour for ending wartime rationing and price controls too slowly, and for the rise of industrial conflicts after the end of the wartime wage freeze and Defence Regulations bans on strike actions. 

As for the Liberal Party, its poor election result in 1950 only worsened this time; unable to get the same insurance against losses of deposits that it did in the previous year, it was able to field only 109 candidates as opposed to 478 in 1950, and thus posted the worst general election result in the party's history, getting just 2.5% of the vote and winning only six seats. The Liberals' (and later the Liberal Democrats') popular vote total has not fallen so low since, though their lowest total of six seats would be matched in several future elections. The Liberal Party's growing irrelevance weakened the Labour Party, for two-thirds of potential Liberal voters supported the Conservatives.

Four candidates were returned unopposed, all of them Ulster Unionists in Northern Ireland. This is the most recent general election in which any candidates have been returned unopposed, although there have since been unopposed by-elections.

The subsequent Labour defeat was significant for several reasons: the party polled almost a quarter of a million votes more than the Conservative Party and its National Liberal Party ally combined; won the most votes that Labour has ever won (as of 2019); and won the most votes of any political party in any election in British political history, a number not surpassed until the Conservative Party's victory in 1992.

Despite this, the Conservative Party formed the next government with a majority of 17 seats. It performed much better with male working-class voters than in the elections of 1945 or 1950, and was able to tip the vote away from Labour in Lancashire, the Home Counties, and East Anglia. Under the first-past-the-post electoral system, many Labour votes were 'wasted' as part of large majorities for MPs in safe seats.

Results

|}

Total votes cast: 28,596,594.

Votes summary

Headline swing: 1.13% to Conservative.

Seats summary

Transfers of seats 
All comparisons are with the 1950 election.

See also
List of MPs elected in the 1951 United Kingdom general election
1951 United Kingdom general election in Northern Ireland
1951 Prime Minister's Resignation Honours

Notes

References

Sources

 , The standard study

External links
United Kingdom election results—summary results 1885–1979
Churchill & the 1951 General Election - UK Parliament Living Heritage

Manifestos
, 1951 Conservative Party manifesto
Labour Party Election Manifesto, 1951 Labour Party manifesto
The Nation's Task, 1951 Liberal Party manifesto

 
General election
1951
General election
Electoral history of Winston Churchill
Clement Attlee